Diego Ferreira Matheus (born 26 February 1996), known as Diego Ferreira, is a Brazilian footballer who plays as a right back for Tombense.

Club career
Born in Niterói, Rio de Janeiro, Diego represented Botafogo as a youth. He made his senior debut on 30 April 2015, starting in a 2–1 Copa do Brasil away win against Capivariano; he also provided the assist for Sassá's goal.

On 21 December 2015, after contributing with seven Série B matches, Diego renewed his contract until the end of 2018. He made his Série A debut the following 2 June, starting in a 1–0 home loss against Cruzeiro.

On 18 January 2017, after being rarely used, Diego was loaned to Chiapas. In November, he moved to Atlético Paranaense on loan from Tombense, being initially assigned to the under-23 squad. He was loaned again, to Fortaleza on 21 December 2018, on a one-year contract. After playing just two matches with Fortaleza, his loan contract was cancelled in favour of another loan deal with América Mineiro.

Honours
Botafogo
Campeonato Brasileiro Série B: 2015

References

External links

1996 births
Living people
Sportspeople from Niterói
Brazilian footballers
Association football defenders
Campeonato Brasileiro Série A players
Campeonato Brasileiro Série B players
Botafogo de Futebol e Regatas players
Tombense Futebol Clube players
Club Athletico Paranaense players
Chiapas F.C. footballers
Fortaleza Esporte Clube players
América Futebol Clube (MG) players
Brazilian expatriate footballers
Brazilian expatriate sportspeople in Mexico
Expatriate footballers in Mexico